The Tamil National Liberation Alliance (TNLA) was a Sri Lankan political alliance representing the Sri Lankan Tamil ethnic minority in the country. It was launched on 22 February 2010 as breakaway faction of the Tamil National Alliance (TNA). In June 2011 the party was dissolved and its leaders rejoined Tamil Eelam Liberation Organization and the TNA.

References

2010 establishments in Sri Lanka
2011 disestablishments in Sri Lanka
Defunct political party alliances in Sri Lanka
Political parties established in 2010
Political parties disestablished in 2011
Political parties in Sri Lanka
Tamil Eelam
Sri Lankan Tamil nationalist parties